Birds of Tokyo is the third album by Australian alternative rock band Birds of Tokyo, released on 23 July 2010 through EMI Records. It was recorded in Sydney, Australia; New York City; London; and Gothenburg, Sweden, produced by Scott Horscroft, co-produced by Adam Spark and mixed by Michael Brauer. This is the last album to feature Anthony Jackson on bass guitar before his departure in March 2011. 
At the J Awards of 2010, the album was nominated for Australian Album of the Year.

The album won the ARIA Award for Best Rock Album in 2010.

History
In early 2010 the band returned to the studio to commence work on their third album. March 2010 saw the release of "The Saddest Thing I Know" and the announcement of an Australian tour by the same name, supported by New Zealand-based band Midnight Youth. The second single "Plans" was premiered on Richard Kingsmill's '2010' show on Triple j Radio on Sunday 20 June.

Track listing

CD

DVD
 "The Saddest Thing I Know" promotional video clip – 3:14
 "The Saddest Thing I Know" (3D version) promotional video clip – 3:14
 The Making of "The Saddest Thing I Know" – 2:55
 The Making of "The Saddest Thing I Know" (3D version) – 3:11
 "Plans" promotional video clip – 3:37
 The Making of "Plans" – 6:17
 Studio 301 Live Session ("The Saddest Thing I Know", "Murmurs", "Wild at Heart", "Circles", "In the Veins of Death Valley" and "Wayside") – 28:49
 Making of the Album Studio Footage – 11:02
 Interview with Scott Horscroft and Adam Spark – 14:15
 Photo montage (52 photos) – 2:53

Personnel
 Ian Kenny – vocals
 Adam Spark – guitars, vocals, keyboards
 Adam Weston – drums, percussion
 Anthony Jackson – bass

Additional musicians
 Glenn Sarangapany – keyboards, synthesizers

=Production
 All songs written by Birds of Tokyo
 Producer – Scott Horscroft
 Co-producer – Adam Spark
 Engineer (assistant) – Jean-Paul Fung
 Mixer – Michael Brauer
 Mastering – Bob Ludwig
 Recorded at Big Jesus Burger Studios
 Recorded at Svenska Grammofonstudion
 Recorded at Air Studios
 Mixed at Electric Lady Studios
 Mastered by Gateway Mastering

Charts

Weekly charts

Year-end charts

Certifications

References

2010 albums
ARIA Award-winning albums
Birds of Tokyo albums